The Journal of the Royal Geographical Society of London was a scholarly geographic journal published by the Royal Geographical Society from 1831 to 1880.

After 1881, the Journal was absorbed by the Proceedings, published as Proceedings of the Royal Geographical Society of London from 1856 to 1878, and as Proceedings of the Royal Geographical Society and Monthly Record of Geography from 1879 to 1892. In 1893, it was renamed The Geographical Journal, which is still published to this day, although since 2000 it is no longer the journal of report for the society.

External links
 Fulltext via HathiTrust

Geography journals
Publications established in 1831
Publications disestablished in 1880